Marcel Arntz (born 18 November 1965) is a Dutch former cyclist. He competed in the men's cross-country mountain biking event at the 1996 Summer Olympics.

References

External links
 

1965 births
Living people
Dutch male cyclists
Olympic cyclists of the Netherlands
Cyclists at the 1996 Summer Olympics
Cyclists from Gelderland